Shaheed is a 1962 Pakistani Urdu language music blockbuster classical film directed and produced by Khalil Qaiser under the banner of K K Productions. It is written by Riaz Shahid, while the music is composed by Rashid Attre. It features Musarrat Nazir, Allauddin and Husna in the lead among other protagonist characters. It is recognized one of the successful films of the Pakistani cinema while its film budge and theatrical box office metrics are uncertain. In 2016, the Lok Virsa Museum screened the film as part of retaining historical film records in the museum.

Attre's composition from the poems by Munir Niazi and Faiz Ahmad Faiz played a prominent role in the film. It was later nominated for the Nigar Awards, presented by the Nigar magazine. The film became the recipient of nine Nigar Awards, leading it to become one of the Pakistani films with maximum awards received. The film revolves around political and social themes, in particular anti-imperialism theme reportedly based on Lawrence of Arabia. A few years later when the film was released, its director was killed by an unidentified person or a group of people.

Plot 
 
The fictional story of the film involves a European trader named Lawrence  who arrives in Saudi Arabia wearing a helmet with a cigar in his hand, accompanied by his femme fatale named Laila. After reaching in the country, he formulates a plan to extract petroleum from the Arabian Desert. He subsequently meets a person named Haris who works as an Arab blacksmith. Haris decides to resist the European trader, a former chieftain who has been exiled from the desert or the country, while Emir  opposes petroleum extraction. Laila falls in love with Haris, he however falls in love with Aaliya. After she learns about his love, she returns to her home and this event leaves her heart broken. She then sings a song titled "Us bewafa ka shahar" (the city of the unfaithful) which became one of the prominent songs of the 1960s.

Laila, a femme fatale has been exiled from the tribe for her involvement in street dancing which is supposed to be a shameful act in the Arabian tribes. Despite being neglected by Haris, she wants him to takeover the trader, and later she sets herself ablaze for Harris's victory in resistance and the oil refinery is damaged. She also sets herself ablaze as a result of her honour suicide in an attempt to regain her pride in the tribe and to save her country from the foreigner.

Cast 
 Talish as Lawrence
 Musarrat Nazir as Laila
 Ejaz Durrani as Haris
 Husna as Aaliya
 Allauddin as Emir

Soundtrack

Awards and nominations

References

External links 

1962 films
1960s Urdu-language films
1960s musical drama films
Films scored by Rashid Attre
Pakistani musical films
Films set in Pakistan
Films shot in Pakistan
Nigar Award winners
Lollywood films
1962 drama films
Cultural depictions of T. E. Lawrence
1960s historical drama films
Films set in deserts
Urdu-language Pakistani films